Xyla Foxlin is an American engineer, entrepreneur and YouTuber. She graduated from Case Western Reserve University in 2019 with a B.S.E. in General Engineering focusing in Mechatronics and Creative Technology. Foxlin provides YouTube tutorial videos, guiding viewers through technical projects. She served as Executive Director for 501-c(3) non-profit Beauty and the Bolt which aims to lower the barrier to entry for women and minorities in STEM fields.

Biography 
Foxlin grew up in the Boston area and attended Lexington High School. As a sophomore, she found part-time work by using a hyperlocal job search website called HelpAroundTown. She was captain of the school's robotics team in her junior and senior years. She attended Case Western University and majored in mechanical and aerospace engineering where she was described in a magazine as a "robotics whiz kid". She was president of the college's robotics mining team.

While in Cleveland, she entered a beauty contest and won the title for Miss Greater Cleveland; her skill was playing a violin using a Tesla coil that she developed.

In 2017 when she was doxxed and harassed by an anonymous Twitter follower, she subpoenaed Twitter to find the identity of her harasser; it turned out she was a woman and fellow robotics student that Foxlin had once mentored.

In 2018, Foxlin was named as one of Crain's Cleveland Business's most Notable Women in Technology.

Career

Parihug 
Foxlin invented a huggable teddy bear called Parihug which features two matching bears; each bear is "stuffed with wireless and Bluetooth technology" so that when it is hugged, it sends a signal to its twin over the Internet so that a person with the other bear will feel it vibrate softly and get a message about the hug. The toy attracted sufficient attention so that it became a startup firm. With co-founder Harshita Gupta, the stuffed animals won the SXSW Tech Fest Reader's Choice award. She also won the university's Spartan Challenge Entrepreneurial Competition in its development.

Beauty and the Bolt 
With a classmate, she launched a 501-c(3) non-profit called Beauty and the Bolt to empower women and minorities to excel in engineering. The website was described as an "online village that is designed to reduce the barrier to entry into makerspaces". It offers video tutorials about 3-D printing, cutting with lasers, soldering, and other engineering-related tasks. Forbes magazine described her as an inspiring role model who has been working to close the "STEM gender gap" by utilizing modern media.

YouTube 
Foxlin designs and builds projects requiring woodworking and engineering skills, and posts YouTube videos about how she went about building them. For example, in 2021, at the request of a fellow YouTuber, Derek Muller, she built a model car that uses a gear and propeller system to apply drive from a treadmill to make it travel faster than the treadmill was running; she was able to build the vehicle after learning that the key design detail is the vehicle speed ratio, which describes the optimal way to transmit power from the wheels to spin the propeller. She launched a tiara into space using weather balloon technology, with cameras on the balloon to record the flight and send back data to her controller. The camera, but not the tiara, was recovered hundreds of miles away.

In May 2021, she built a high powered wood rocket in five days. She built a kayak out of clear fiberglass and lit it internally with a plethora of LED colored lights, so her craft, which she nicknamed Rainbowt, lights up on the water even at night. In another video, Foxlin went on a cross country road trip through the southern and western United States, collecting a piece of wood from trees grown in each of the states, which she machined into wooden puzzle pieces of a map of the country. In 2021, Foxlin designed a bulletproof gown and then shot bullets at the gown to see if the kevlar materials in the gown were effective at stopping the bullets. At Christmastime in 2021, along with Joe Barnard, she shot a seven foot tall Christmas tree 300 feet into the air, with a "rocket stuffed up its ... bottom".

Recognition 
In 2021, a 3D printed statue of her, along with other women leaders in aviation and aerospace-related fields, was displayed at Dallas Love Field airport in Texas as a preview of an exhibition called #IfThenSheCan – The Exhibit. Foxlin's 3D printed statue was also displayed at the Smithsonian Institution in Washington, D.C., in March, 2022 within the full #IfThenSheCan – The Exhibit, featuring 120 3D printed statues displayed in celebration of Women's History Month.

References

External links 
 The stuffed animal that’ll hug your kids from afar Parihug 
 Building a giant wooden rocket in 5 days YouTube video
 TEDx talk by Xyla Foxlin
 Launching her crown into outer space YouTube video
 If/Then Digital Exhibit Companion (ifthenexhibit.org)

American beauty pageant winners
American women engineers
American YouTubers
Case Western Reserve University alumni
Lexington High School alumni
Living people
21st-century American women
Year of birth missing (living people)